Nenad Mišković (Serbian Cyrillic: Ненад Мишковић; born 13 October 1975) is a Bosnian former professional footballer who played as a defender.

Club career
During his playing career, Mišković represented numerous clubs, namely Radnički Beograd, Roda JC, Proleter Zrenjanin, Partizan, Cercle Brugge, Rad, Mladost Apatin and Banat Zrenjanin.

International career
He made his debut for Bosnia and Herzegovina in a March 2000 friendly match against Macedonia and has earned a total of 7 caps, scoring no goals. His final international was a February 2003 friendly away against Wales.

Statistics

Honours
Partizan
First League of Serbia and Montenegro: 1998–99, 2001–02, 2002–03
Serbia and Montenegro Cup: 2000–01

References

External links

1975 births
Living people
Footballers from Sarajevo
Serbs of Bosnia and Herzegovina
Association football defenders
Bosnia and Herzegovina footballers
Bosnia and Herzegovina international footballers
FK Radnički Beograd players
Roda JC Kerkrade players
FK Proleter Zrenjanin players
FK Partizan players
Cercle Brugge K.S.V. players
FK Rad players
FK Mladost Apatin players
FK Banat Zrenjanin players
First League of Serbia and Montenegro players
Second League of Serbia and Montenegro players
Eredivisie players
Belgian Pro League players
Serbian SuperLiga players
Bosnia and Herzegovina expatriate footballers
Expatriate footballers in Serbia and Montenegro
Bosnia and Herzegovina expatriate sportspeople in Serbia and Montenegro
Expatriate footballers in the Netherlands
Bosnia and Herzegovina expatriate sportspeople in the Netherlands
Expatriate footballers in Belgium
Bosnia and Herzegovina expatriate sportspeople in Belgium
Expatriate footballers in Serbia
Bosnia and Herzegovina expatriate sportspeople in Serbia